Rigas Efstathiadis (29 November 1931 – 18 September 2017) was a Greek pole vaulter who competed in the 1952 Summer Olympics.

References

External links
 

1931 births
2017 deaths
Greek male pole vaulters
Olympic athletes of Greece
Athletes (track and field) at the 1952 Summer Olympics
Panathinaikos Athletics
Gold Crosses of the Order of the Phoenix (Greece)
Recipients of the Order of Honour (Greece)
Mediterranean Games gold medalists for Greece
Mediterranean Games medalists in athletics
Athletes (track and field) at the 1959 Mediterranean Games
20th-century Greek people
21st-century Greek people
Athletes from Athens